Diósgyőr-Vasgyári Testgyakorlók Köre is a professional football club based in Miskolc, Hungary.

1910s
The preparations for the establishment of a sports club of the ironworks started at the end of the 1909. Vilmos Vanger, an elementary school teacher and a five-member committee asked the director of the iron works to approve the foundation of a sports club. On 6 February 1910, the Diósgyőr-Vasgyári Testgyakorlók Köre was founded at the premises of the factory. The red and white were chosen as the colours of the club. Vilmos Vanger was nominated as the first president of the club, while, Árpád Weisz became the vice-president. The secretary was Andor Erdélyi, while the finance director was István Hamza. The first coach of the club was Gyula Molnár.

The foundation of the club was approved by the Ministry of Interior therefore the club could participate in a Hungarian League match as early as 1912. In 1916 and 1918 the club won the Northern Hungarian championships. The club had played with all of the first league teams when it celebrated its 10th birthday.

1940s
The club first reached the top league of the Hungarian League in 1940. In the 1940–41 season Diósgyőr finished 6th as Diósgyőri MÁVAG. János Füzér and István Berecz scored 33 goals during the season. In the following season, 1941–42 Diósgyőr finished 8th. During this season the club was able to beat Ferencváros by 3–2 during the season. The results of the 1942–43 season was a bit worse since the club finished only the 12th, however, during this season they also could beat its Budapest rival Ferencváros 2–1 at home. In the 1943–44 season the club finished 11th.

1970s

Diósgyőr won the 1976–77 season of the Hungarian Cup, therefore they qualified for the UEFA Cup Winners' Cup 1977-78 season. In the first round they encountered with the Turkish Beşiktaş J.K. The first leg was won by the Turkish club 2–0 at the İnönü Stadium, while Diósgyőr trashed Besiktas at home in Miskolc. In the second round Diósgyőr hosted the  1976–77 Yugoslav Cup winner Hajduk Split and they won the match by 2–1. However, in the second leg the Hungarian team lost to 2–1 and 4–3 on penalty shoot-out.

In the 1978–79 season of the Hungarian League the club has reached its best result ever finishing on the third position of the table. Therefore, they qualified for the 1979-80 UEFA Cup. On 19 September 1979 Diósgyőr was hosted by SK Rapid Wien at the Gerhard Hanappi Stadium and the match was won by the Hungarian club by 1–0. On 3 October 1979 the second leg was also won by the Hungarian club by 3–2. On 24 October 1979, Diósgyőr was hosted by the Scottish club, Dundee United F.C. at the Tannadice Park. The match was won by Diósgyőr. The second leg was won by Diósgyőr by 3–1 at home, therefore the Hungarian team could qualify for the third round of the cup. on 28 November 1979, in the third round Diósgyőr faced with the giant German club 1. FC Kaiserslautern and they lost 2–0 at home which resulted a very difficult return match for the Miskolc team. On 12 December 1979 Kaiserslautern beat Diósgyőr 6–1 which resulted the farewell for the team since the German club advanced on 8–1 aggregate.

1990s

The fall of communism in Hungary also affected the club as any other clubs in the country. In 1992 the club's name was changed into Diósgyőri FC. In 2000 the club went bankrupt and many players left the club. Disógyőr was able to finish the 1999–2000 season but they were relegated since the club finished 16th.

The team spent seven years in the 2nd division. After many coaches, the breakthrough was the second appearance of coach Barnabás Tornyi. The next year they were again in the first division. The most memorable scenes were winning the second division championship, and the last match of goalkeeping-legend György Veréb. At his last match (aged 49!) and with him the team defeated the Videoton FC, 4–1. The leading players were midfielder László Kiser, and striker duo Sándor Kulcsár and Gábor Egressy. In the next season the team beat the FTC and the Újpest FC, and began the UEFA Intertoto Cup. The owners wanted to make football without spending money, and the club disappeared in 2000, via bankruptcy. In the winter of 1999 most players left the club.

2000s

After the bankruptcy the fans founded again the Diósgyőri VTK and enlisted it into the Hungarian League. The club spent its first season in the seventh division. However, thanks to a merger with Borsod Volán SE the club could play in the third division in the 2000–01 season of the Hungarian League. Although the club could not get promoted into the second division, Diósgyőr could play in the second division again in the 2001–02 season since they merged with Bőcs who already got promoted to the second division. In the second league financial problems also hindered the success of the club and finally the club went bankrupt again. However, the Diósgyőri VTK 1910 Limited company was founded and later purchased the right to play in the second division from Monor. In 2003–04 the club was promoted to the first division of the Hungarian League, although due to financial problems the club was able to play in the first league with the help of the Siófok KC Ltd. who moved to Miskolc.

Diósgyőr play in the 2004–05, 2005–06, 2006–07, 2007–08, 2008–09, 2009–10 seasons of the first division. However, the centenarian celebrations were ruined by the fact that the club finished 16th and was relegated to the second division after spending six consecutive seasons in the top flight of the Hungarian league.

2010s

Diósgyőr won the 2010–11 season of the second division of the Hungarian league and it was promoted after spending only one season in the second league. In the 2011–12 season the club finished 7th. On 27 July 2012 Diósgyőr started 2012–13 Nemzeti Bajnokság I season with a 2–1 victory over Újpest FC. On 12 September 2012 Hungarian international team player and former Genoa C.F.C. player Gergely Rudolf signed a three-year contract with Diósgyőr.

On 7 May 2014, Diósgyőr qualified for the final of the 2013–14 Hungarian Cup after beating Debrecen 2–0 at home. The first tie was won by Debrecen by 4–2. Diósgyőr lost to Újpest in the 2013–14 Hungarian Cup final on penalty shoot-out, but Diósgyőr are eligible for the 2014-15 UEFA Europa League since Újpest did not receive the UEFA licence from the Hungarian Football Federation. The team pulled a miraculous escape from relegation in 2018. They started their last game in last place but still survived by beating champions Videoton and other results going in their favour.

2020s
On 6 February 2021, Diósgyőr celebrated their 111-year anniversary by beating Kisvárda FC at home 2–0 on the 20th match day of the 2020-21 Nemzeti Bajnokság I season. After the match in an interview, Zoran Zekić said that if the club continues like this, they will not be relegated.

In the 2021-22 Nemzeti Bajnokság II season, Diósgyőr finished third; therefore, could not get promoted to the first division. Diósgyőr was preceded by Vasas SC and Kecskeméti TE.

On 23 August 2022, Dragan Vukmir was sacked and one day later was replaced by Serhiy Kuznetsov. Vukmir won two matches and lost three matches in the first five match days of the 2022-23 Nemzeti Bajnokság II season.

References

External links

Diósgyőri VTK